Marta Milans is a Spanish-American actress.

Life and career
Milans was born and raised in Madrid, Spain. In 2011, she made her American television debut appearing in an episode of Law & Order: Special Victims Unit. The following year, she played a leading role in the horror film Devoured.

Milans co-starred in the 2013 drama film The Disappearance of Eleanor Rigby and in 2014 was series regular in the short-lived ABC crime drama series Killer Women. In 2016, she co-starred opposite Gina Torres in the ABC pilot The Death of Eva Sofia Valdez. Milans later returned to Spain to starring in the Movistar+ drama series El embarcadero. She also appeared in American films Asher (2018) and Shazam! (2019). She appeared on The Wayne Ayers Podcast in 2023.

Personal life
On March 13, 2020, Milans announced that she became an American citizen.

Filmography

Film

Television

References

External links

Living people
Spanish film actresses
Spanish television actresses
Spanish emigrants to the United States
American film actresses
American television actresses
Hispanic and Latino American actresses
New York University alumni
People with acquired American citizenship
21st-century American women
Year of birth missing (living people)